The Juvenile is a greyhound racing competition held annually at Towcester Greyhound Stadium.

Race history

It was inaugurated in 1957 at Wimbledon Stadium and was known as the Greyhound Express Merit Puppy Trophy but in 1964 it was renamed the Juvenile. The event is an invitation competition for the best six greyhounds who still have a puppy status.

In 2017 the race switched to Central Park Stadium in Sittingbourne following the closure of Wimbledon Stadium. The relocation of the competition to Central Park continued a family legacy for the Cearns family who had been connected with the race when it was first held in 1957.

From 2018 the competition was held at Owlerton Stadium before switching to Towcester Greyhound Stadium in 2021.

Past winners

Venues 
1957–2011 (Wimbledon, 460m)
2012–2016 (Wimbledon, 480m)
2017–2017 (Central Park, 480m)
2018–2020 (Sheffield, 500m)
2021–2021 (Towcester, 500m)

Sponsors
1957–1966 (Greyhound Express)
1993–1998 (Sporting Life)
1999–present (Racing Post)

References

Greyhound racing competitions in the United Kingdom
Sport in Sittingbourne
Sport in Sheffield
Recurring sporting events established in 1957
Greyhound racing in London